Charles Jared Ingersoll (October 3, 1782 – May 14, 1862) was an American lawyer, writer and politician who served as a Democratic member of the U.S. House of Representatives for Pennsylvania's 1st congressional district from 1813 to 1815, Pennsylvania's 3rd congressional district from 1841 to 1843 and Pennsylvania's 4th congressional district from 1843 to 1849.  He served as a member of the Pennsylvania House of Representatives in 1830.

Early life and education
Ingersoll was born in Philadelphia, Pennsylvania to Jared Ingersoll and Elizabeth Petit.  His father served in the Continental Congress and his brother of Joseph Reed Ingersoll served as a member of the U.S. House of Representative for Pennsylvania.  His maternal grandfather, Charles Pettit, served as a delegate for Pennsylvania to the Confederation Congress.

Charles Ingersoll dropped out of the College of New Jersey, later Princeton University, in 1799. He then studied law, was admitted to the bar in 1802 and commenced practice in Philadelphia. He traveled in Europe, accompanied by Rufus King, the United States minister to the United Kingdom.

Career
In 1812, Ingersoll was elected as a Democratic-Republican to the Thirteenth Congress, where he served as chairman of the United States House Committee on the Judiciary.  He was not a candidate for renomination in 1814, having been appointed United States district attorney for Pennsylvania.  He served in that office from 1815 to 1829, and was a member of the Pennsylvania canal and internal improvement convention in 1825.  In 1829, he was removed from the office of district attorney by U.S. President Andrew Jackson.

In 1815, Ingersoll was elected a member of the American Philosophical Society.

He was a member of the Pennsylvania House of Representatives in 1830, and a member of the State constitutional convention in 1837. He was appointed secretary of the legation to Prussia on March 8, 1837.  He was an unsuccessful candidate in 1837 for election to fill the vacancy caused by the death of Francis J. Harper in the Twenty-fifth Congress.  He was again an unsuccessful candidate for election in 1838.

Ingersoll was elected as a Democrat to the Twenty-seventh and to the three succeeding Congresses.  He served as chairman of the United States House Committee on Foreign Affairs during the Twenty-eighth and Twenty-ninth Congresses).  He was not a candidate for renomination in 1848.  He was appointed Minister to France in 1847 but was not confirmed by the Senate.

Beginning in 1845 Ingersoll wrote several editions of a history of the War of 1812, including descriptions of the Congressional investigation of the Burning of Washington in 1814.

He died in 1862 in Philadelphia and is interred at The Woodlands Cemetery.

Personal life
In 1804, Ingersoll married Mary Wilcocks, the daughter of Alexander Wilcocks, and together had six surviving sons and 2 daughters.  His son Edward Ingersoll wrote on legal topics.

Bibliography
 “Chiomara,” a poem published in The Port Folio (1800)
 Edwy and Elgira, a tragedy (Philadelphia, 1801)
 Right and Wrongs, Power and Policy of the United States of America (1808)
 Inchiquin the Jesuit's Letters on American Literature and Politics (New York, 1810)
 “Julian,” a dramatic poem (1831)
 Historical Sketch of the Second War between the United States and Great Britain (4 vols., Philadelphia, 1845-'52).
 Recollections, Historical, Political, Biographical, and Social, of Charles J. Ingersoll. (Philadelphia: Lippincott & Co., 1861)

He also published numerous anonymous contributions to the Democratic Press of Philadelphia, and to the National Intelligencer of Washington, on the controversies with England before the War of 1812 (1811–15). He published several “Speeches” concerning that war (1813–15), a discourse before the American Philosophical Society on the “Influence of America on the Mind,” which was republished in England and France (1823), a translation of a French work on the freedom of navigation, in the American Law Journal of 1829, and many other literary and political discourses. At the time of his death, he was preparing a History of the Territorial Acquisitions of the United States.

References

Sources

The Political Graveyard

Attribution

External links

 The Charles Jared Ingersoll papers, including correspondence and writings, are available for research use at the Historical Society of Pennsylvania.

1782 births
1862 deaths
19th-century American politicians
American male non-fiction writers
American naval historians
Burials at The Woodlands Cemetery
Democratic-Republican Party members of the United States House of Representatives
Historians from Pennsylvania
Ingersoll family
Democratic Party members of the United States House of Representatives from Pennsylvania
Democratic Party members of the Pennsylvania House of Representatives
Pennsylvania Democratic-Republicans
Pennsylvania lawyers
Politicians from Philadelphia
United States Attorneys for the District of Pennsylvania
19th-century American lawyers